Trigger 4, also known as Trigger Four, is an outdoor 1979 steel sculpture by Lee Kelly, located on the Reed College campus in Portland, Oregon.

Description and history
Trigger 4 was designed by Lee Kelly and installed in front of the Studio Art Building on the Reed College campus in southeast Portland in 1979. Kelly had served as a visiting associate professor of art at Reed between 1976 and 1979. Like the Studio Art Building, the sculpture was donated to the college by John Gray, who served as chairman of the Board of Trustees, and his wife Betty.

The Cor-Ten or mild steel sculpture measures approximately  x  x  and contains an inscription of Kelly's signature and the number 79 on the bottom of the post on the sculpture's northwest side. The Smithsonian Institution describes the work as an abstract ("geometric") sculpture "whose primary forms are triangles and lines". Its condition was deemed "treatment needed" by Smithsonian's "Save Outdoor Sculpture!" program in February 1994.

Reception
Following the sculpture's installation, Reed magazine questioned whether it depicted a Chinese character, a horse, or simply an abstract figures formed by lines and angles, saying "perhaps the beauty of the new Lee Kelly sculpture... is that it can evoke different images and meanings." The magazine also said the rust-colored sculpture provides a "striking contrast" to the blue roof and grey exterior walls of the newly constructed Studio Art Building.

See also
 1979 in art

References

1979 establishments in Oregon
1979 sculptures
Abstract sculptures in Oregon
Outdoor sculptures in Portland, Oregon
Reed College campus
Sculptures by Lee Kelly
Steel sculptures in Oregon
Weathering steel